Vladimir Aleksandrovich Yesin (born 11 January 1995) is a Russian football player who plays for Smorgon.

Club career
He made his debut in the Russian Football National League for FC Petrotrest Saint Petersburg on 20 May 2013 in a game against FC Rotor Volgograd.

References

External links
 
 Career summary by sportbox.ru
 

1995 births
Footballers from Saint Petersburg
Living people
Russian footballers
Association football forwards
Association football midfielders
Russia youth international footballers
FC Petrotrest players
FC Dynamo Saint Petersburg players
FC Dynamo Stavropol players
Luftëtari Gjirokastër players
1. SC Znojmo players
FC Salyut Belgorod players
FC Slavia Mozyr players
FC Smorgon players
Moravian-Silesian Football League players
Crimean Premier League players
Russian expatriate footballers
Expatriate footballers in Albania
Russian expatriate sportspeople in Albania
Expatriate footballers in the Czech Republic
Expatriate footballers in Belarus